This is a list of countries by lithium mine production from 2018 onwards.
 Lithium Triangle state

See also
 Lithium Triangle

Notes

References

External links
 (Data in metric tons of lithium content unless otherwise noted)
 Top Lithium-producing Countries Sep. 01, 2021

Lists of countries by mineral production
Lithium